The 1998 Scottish Claymores season was the fourth year of competition for the franchise in the NFL Europe League (NFLEL). The team was led by head coach Jim Criner in his fourth year, and played its home games at Murrayfield Stadium in Edinburgh (four) and Hampden Park in Glasgow, Scotland (one). They finished the regular season in sixth place with a record of two wins and eight losses.

Offseason

NFL Europe League draft

Personnel

Staff

Roster

Standings

Game summaries

Week 9: at Frankfurt Galaxy

References

Scottish Claymores seasons